Dhulabari railway station is a railway station on Katihar–Siliguri branch of Howrah–New Jalpaiguri line in the Katihar railway division of Northeast Frontier Railway zone. It is situated at Pamal, Dhulabari of Kishanganj district in the Indian state of Bihar.

The station is served by a double-track electric rail line.

References

Railway stations in Kishanganj district
Katihar railway division